Marcos Alonso Mendoza (born 28 December 1990) is a Spanish professional footballer who plays as a centre-back or left-back for La Liga club Barcelona and the Spain national team.

Alonso started his career with Real Madrid but went on to make his name with Bolton Wanderers in England and later with Fiorentina in Italy. His success at the latter club led Chelsea to sign him for an estimated £24 million in 2016, going on to win multiple honours with the club including a Premier League and UEFA Champions League title.

Alonso made his full debut for Spain in March 2018.

Club career

Real Madrid

Born in Madrid, Alonso joined Real Madrid's youth academy as a child, going on to represent every youth side in the following years. In 2008, he reached Real Madrid Castilla which competed in Segunda División B, and first appeared for the reserve team on 22 February 2008, playing the entire match in a 1–0 home loss against AD Alcorcón.

On 11 December 2009, Alonso was first summoned by the main squad – coached by Manuel Pellegrini – for a La Liga match at Valencia CF. Eventually, he did not make the final list of 18, and his debut arrived on 4 April of the following year as he came on as a substitute for Gonzalo Higuaín in the 90th minute of a 2–0 win away to Racing de Santander.

Bolton Wanderers
Alonso joined Bolton Wanderers of the Premier League for an undisclosed fee, on 27 July 2010. He made his competitive debut for the club in a League Cup 1–0 away win against Southampton on 24 August; his first league appearance arrived on 1 January 2011, starting for suspended Paul Robinson in a 2–1 away loss to Liverpool at Anfield.

Alonso scored his first goal for Bolton on 31 March 2012, netting the second in an eventual 3–2 success away to Wolverhampton Wanderers. At the end of the 2012–13 season, he was voted The Bolton News player of the year, winning 37% of the vote: Marc Iles wrote, "...this has been a break-out season for the former Real Madrid starlet. Alonso has grown in stature and become a consistent performer at full-back – chipping in with some important goals too."

Fiorentina
In May 2013, Alonso signed for Italian side ACF Fiorentina on a three-year deal, despite being offered a new contract by Bolton manager Dougie Freedman. On 30 December, after the player had made nine official appearances, Sunderland boss Gus Poyet announced that he would join on 1 January 2014, on loan until the end of the campaign.

Alonso played his first match with Sunderland on 7 January 2014, featuring the full 90 minutes in a 2–1 home win over Manchester United for the League Cup semi-final first leg and being given the man of the match award by Sky Sports. He played in the final of the competition on 2 March, not being able to prevent a 3–1 loss against Manchester City; he contributed with 20 appearances all competitions comprised, helping his team retain their top flight status.

Upon his return from loan, Alonso became a regular, amassing over 70 appearances in his final two seasons in purple. On 19 March 2015 he scored his first goal for the Viola, in a 3–0 win away to fellow Italians A.S. Roma for the round of 16 of the UEFA Europa League.

Chelsea

On 30 August 2016, after 85 appearances and five goals overall with Fiorentina, Alonso completed his move back to England after signing a five-year contract with Chelsea worth around £24 million. He made his debut on 20 September, playing the full 120 minutes in a 4–2 win away to Leicester City for the EFL Cup, and four days later he first appeared in the league in a 3–0 away defeat to Arsenal, coming off the bench for Cesc Fàbregas in the 55th minute.

Alonso scored his first goal for the club on 5 November 2016, in a 5–0 victory over Everton at Stamford Bridge. He added two more at the King Power Stadium, in a 3–0 win against Leicester on 14 January 2017.

In April 2018, Alonso came under extensive criticism for seemingly purposely digging the studs of his boots into Shane Long's leg during a tackle in a league game against Southampton. He was not reprimanded in any way by referee Mike Dean – who came under similar criticism – but was later charged with violent conduct by The Football Association, and later issued a three-match ban.

Alonso opened his goal account of the 2018–19 season on 18 August 2018, scoring the 3–2 winner in the 81st minute of the home fixture against Arsenal.

Alonso scored the only goal against Newcastle United at home on 19 October 2019, giving Chelsea a narrow 1–0 win. It was his first goal of the 2019–20 season.

Alonso scored his first goal of the 2020–21 season on 31 January 2021, scoring the second in a 2–0 home win over Burnley, helping new head coach Thomas Tuchel to his first victory. On 8 May 2021, Alonso scored the winning goal against Manchester City as Chelsea won 2–1 at the Etihad Stadium. Alonso did not come off the bench as Chelsea defeated Manchester City 1–0 in the 2021 UEFA Champions League Final.

Alonso scored Chelsea's opening goal of the 2021–22 season against Crystal Palace, from a free-kick in a 3–0 home win. He captained the club for the first time on 11 September 2021 in a league match at home to Aston Villa.

Barcelona
On 2 September 2022, Alonso signed for La Liga club Barcelona on a one-year contract after leaving Chelsea by mutual consent a day earlier. On 1 November, he scored his first Champions League goal in a 4–2 away win over Viktoria Plzeň.

International career
On 16 March 2018, Alonso received his first call-up for the Spain national team for friendlies against Germany and Argentina later that month. He debuted against the latter on the 27th in a 6–1 win at the Wanda Metropolitano where he replaced Jordi Alba with 11 minutes left, making the Alonsos the first Spanish family to have three generations of internationals and seventh worldwide.

Personal life
Alonso's grandfather, Marcos Alonso Imaz (better known as Marquitos), played with Real Madrid's first team for eight years. His father, Marcos Alonso Peña, played several seasons in Spain's top flight, most notably for Atlético Madrid and Barcelona, and both represented Spain at senior level.	

On 3 May 2011, Alonso was the driver in an accident causing the death of a young woman in Madrid. He faced 21 months in prison when sentenced in February 2016, but his punishment was changed to a €61,000 fine and a driving ban of three years and four months, which had already been spent.

Career statistics

Club

International

Honours
Sunderland
Football League Cup runner-up: 2013–14

Chelsea
Premier League: 2016–17
FA Cup: 2017–18; runner-up: 2016–17, 2019–20, 2020–21, 2021–22
UEFA Champions League: 2020–21
UEFA Europa League: 2018–19
UEFA Super Cup: 2021
FIFA Club World Cup: 2021
EFL Cup runner-up: 2018–19, 2021–22

Barcelona
Supercopa de España: 2022–23

Spain
UEFA Nations League runner-up: 2020–21

Individual
PFA Team of the Year: 2017–18 Premier League

References

External links

Profile at the FC Barcelona website

1990 births
Living people
Footballers from Madrid
Spanish footballers
Association football defenders
Association football midfielders
Real Madrid Castilla footballers
Real Madrid CF players
Bolton Wanderers F.C. players
ACF Fiorentina players
Sunderland A.F.C. players
Chelsea F.C. players
FC Barcelona players
Segunda División B players
La Liga players
Premier League players
English Football League players
Serie A players
UEFA Europa League winning players
UEFA Champions League winning players
FA Cup Final players
Spain youth international footballers
Spain international footballers
Spanish expatriate footballers
Expatriate footballers in England
Expatriate footballers in Italy
Spanish expatriate sportspeople in England
Spanish expatriate sportspeople in Italy
Marcos